The Third Division Football Tournament was the tournament for the 2014 season in the Maldives. Dhivehi Sifainge Club went on to win the tournament, beating Police Club 4–2 on penalties as the scores were leveled 1–1 after the final whistle of the final match played on 11 January 2015.

Final

References

Maldivian Third Division Football Tournament seasons
3